Alleyrat is a commune in the Corrèze department in the Nouvelle-Aquitaine region of central France.

The inhabitants of the commune are known as Alleyratois or Alleyratoises

Geography
Alleyrat is located 8 km north-east of Meymac, 11 km north-west of Ussel, and 13 km south of Sornac. Access to the commune is by the D102 road which runs off the D30 west of the commune and passes south-east through the village to join the D57 road in the east. The D57 also passes through the commune in the south from east to west where it joins the D30 just north of Meymac. Apart from the village there are a number of hamlets. These are: Enclisse, Ceppe, Le Soulier, Roumignac, and La Chassagne. The commune is about equally split between forest and farmland.
 
The commune is part of the Regional Natural Park of Millevaches in Limousin.

The river Triouzoune flows south along the western border gathering a number of tributaries which rise in the commune before continuing south to join the Dordogne. Numerous streams rise in the commune - mostly to join the Triouzoune - but some flow east to join the river Diège.

Neighbouring communes and villages

Heraldry

Administration

List of Successive Mayors

Population

Culture and heritage

Civil heritage
The commune has a number of buildings and structures that are registered as historical monuments:
A Farmhouse at La Virolle (1815)
A Farmhouse at Lespinasse (1811)
A Farmhouse at Ceppe (1859)
A Fountain (18th century)
Mills (19th century)
Farmhouses (19th century)

Religious heritage

The commune has several religious buildings and structures that are registered as historical monuments:
The Church of Saint Pierre (14th century)
The Wayside Cross of Saint John (17th century)
Monumental Crosses (17th and 20th centuries)

The Church of Saint Pierre contains many items that are registered as historical objects:

The Furniture in the Church
Part of the Cenotaph (Late Middle Ages)
A Bronze bell (1877)
2 Altar vases
A Processional Banner (1892)
A Processional Banner (19th century)
A Handbell (19th century)
A Sunburst Monstrance (19th century)
A Sunburst Monstrance (1819-1838)
A Ciborium (1798-1809)
A Chalice (19th century)
A Paten (1798-1809)
A Bust-Reliquary: Saint Pierre (17th century)
A Statuette: Saint Pierre (18th century)
A Statuette: Virgin and child (18th century)
A Statuette: Virgin and child (18th century)
A Monumental Painting in the vault of the choir (18th century)
A Low Sideboard (18th century)
A Pulpit (19th century)
A Baptismal font (12th century)
An Altar and Tabernacle (18th century)
An Altar, Retable, and Tabernacle (18th century)

See also
Communes of the Corrèze department

References

External links
Alleyrat on the National Geographic Institute website 
Alleyrat on Géoportail, National Geographic Institute (IGN) website 
Alleyrat on the 1750 Cassini Map

Communes of Corrèze